Firuz Kola-ye Vosta (also Romanized as Fīrūz Kolā-ye Vosţá) is a village in Dasht-e Sar Rural District, Dabudasht District, Amol County, Mazandaran Province, Iran. At the 2006 census, its population was 683, in 180 families.

References 

Populated places in Amol County